The Rajendra Kumar Rai cabinet was the 3rd provincial government of Province No. 1. It was formed after Rajendra Kumar Rai was sworn in as Chief Minister on 2 November 2021. The cabinet was expanded on 6 February 2022.

Chief Minister & Cabinet Ministers

Current Arrangement

See also 

 Provincial governments of Nepal
 1st Province No. 1 Provincial Assembly

References

External links 

 Office of Chief Minister and Council of Ministers of Province No. 1

Provincial cabinets of Nepal
2021 establishments in Nepal
Government of Koshi Province
2023 disestablishments in Nepal